The Williams House and Associated Farmstead is a historic farm property in southern Madison County, Arkansas.  It is located northeast of St. Paul, at the end of County Road 172.  The main house is a -story log structure, fashioned out of hand-hewn timbers fitted together with dovetail joints and concrete chinking.  The property includes a barn, smokehouse, chicken house, and privy, all of which were built around 1922–25.  The house was built in 1935, and is locally unusual for the late date for the use of log construction to build a pioneer-style house.

The property was listed on the National Register of Historic Places in 2001.

See also
National Register of Historic Places listings in Madison County, Arkansas

References

Houses on the National Register of Historic Places in Arkansas
Houses completed in 1935
National Register of Historic Places in Madison County, Arkansas
1935 establishments in Arkansas
Farms on the National Register of Historic Places in Arkansas
Log houses in the United States
Log buildings and structures on the National Register of Historic Places in Arkansas
Rustic architecture in Arkansas